Blandair, also known as Blandair Farm, Blandair Park, and Blandair Regional Park, is 300 acres of former slave plantation located in Columbia, Maryland. The Blandair Foundation estate of Mrs. Smith was purchased by Howard County, Maryland in the late 1990s and is in the process of being developed as a regional park.

History
In 1689, 1087 acres on Elk Ridge, in what was then colonial Maryland's Anne Arundel County, was surveyed for Edward Talbott. Known as "Talbott's Resolution Manor", Talbott bequeathed the property to his children, John and Elizabeth, who each received half of the property after his death in 1689. The land was patented to John and Elizabeth Talbott in 1714, and by 1716 they had quickly sold off 800 acres of the property. By 1753, four different owners were in possession of the original plot: William Hall (500 acres), Nicholas Gassaway (300 acres), Edward Dorsey (200 acres), and Rachel Norwood (87 acres).

In 1804, John Crompton Weems purchased a portion named "La Grange", which he eventually sold to his daughter-in-law, Martha P. Weems. Between 1828 and 1845, Theodorick Bland purchased the farm from the Weems family and under his ownership, the property became known as "Blandair". Sarah Bland Mayo inherited the property upon her father's death and eventually gave the property to her daughter, Sarah Mayo Gaither, as a wedding present in 1857. Bland's descendants owned the property until the Gaithers sold the property in 1867. Another series of owners held the land until it was sold to Baltimore developer Henry E. Smith and his wife, Lillie, in 1937. After Lillie Smith died in 1979, Blandair was inherited by her daughter, Elizabeth, who resided on the property until her death in 1997. In 1997 or August 1998, Blandair was purchased from the Smith family by Howard County, Maryland using State Rural Legacy funds.

Legal challenges delayed planning efforts, but the courts eventually affirmed Howard County's ownership of the property. In 2010 initial construction began on a regional park. The phase I program is part of a series of Howard County projects purchasing historical preservation estates and converting them into a complex of income producing sports fields and facilities such as Troy Hill, and the James and Anne Robinson Nature Center. In 2014, the fields at Blandair were named after Frank S. Turner who helped secure initial open space funding for the $50 million project.

Structures

The estate was documented by the National Park Service's Historic American Buildings Survey in 2003. The main house, known as Blandair Mansion, was built by Bland's descendants in the mid-nineteenth century. As of 2011, the mansion is being restored by the Howard County Department of Recreation and Parks with assistance from the NPS's Historic Preservation Training Center and is slated to become the "historical centerpiece" of Blandair Regional Park. Built around 1845, a small slave quarter stands next to the main dwelling.

Legal battles 

The lawsuit, Blandair Foundation, Inc. et al. v Jane P. Nes et al., against the title of Blandair Farm and the personal estate of Elizabeth C. Smith was filed on June 29, 1998 in the Circuit Court for Howard County, Maryland.  The legal theory behind the suit was that of contract law: Elizabeth C. Smith had promised Byron C. Hall, Jr. that she would form the Blandair Foundation to preserve Blandair Farm, convey the title of Blandair Farm and her entire personal estate to the Blandair Foundation, and to appoint Mr. Hall as a trustee of the Blandair Foundation.  In return, Mr. Hall accepted appointment as a trustee of the Blandair Foundation and promised Miss Smith that he would faithfully carry out her wishes for the preservation of Blandair Farm.  This voluntary exchange of promises constituted a contract that was broken inadvertently by Miss Smith when she died.  The plaintiffs sought specific performance of that contract.

The plaintiffs had two hurdles to overcome: the statute of limitations regarding suits against an estate and the statute of frauds regarding the title of Blandair Farm.  They argued that the nature of the suit did not fit the accepted criteria of claims against an estate and that partial performance of the contract met the requirements of the statute of frauds.

Hearings were held on November 13, 1998, December 17, 1998, and December 7, 1999.  The court ruled against the plaintiffs on all counts, with the final opinion issued on June 23, 2000.  The plaintiffs decided to appeal the rulings to the Maryland Court of Special Appeals.

In their briefs, the appellants alleged that the court had erred 1) by misinterpreting Miss Smith's promise as one to make a gift to a charity rather than as one to create a trust, 2) by misapplying standards to judge partial performance of a contract, and 3) by ignoring the distinction between a claim to part of an estate that could have been enforced before Miss Smith's death and a claim to the entirety of an estate that only could have been enforced after her death.  A hearing was held before a panel of the Court of Special Appeals on March 5, 2001.  On July 31, 2001, the court issued its opinion, rejecting the appeal.

The Appellants filed a petition for a Writ of Certiorari with the Court of Appeals (this is the process in Maryland to obtain a discretionary appeal with that court).  On October 12, 2001, the court issued an Order denying the petition.

See also
List of Howard County properties in the Maryland Historical Trust

Notes

References

Further reading
To Save Her Dream: A Mission of Duty, Friendship and Justice by Byron C. Hall, Jr. PublishAmerica, Baltimore, 2004.

External links
Blandair Park - Howard County Department of Recreation and Parks
Blandair - Preservation Howard County
The Blandair Foundation
Drawings and photographs of Blandair hosted by The Library of Congress

Howard County, Maryland landmarks
Protected areas of Howard County, Maryland